is a city located in northeastern Nara Prefecture, Japan.

The modern city of Uda was established on January 1, 2006, the towns of Haibara, Ōuda and Utano, and the village of Murō (all from Uda District).

As of December 29, 2005, the city had an estimate population of 38,648 and a population density of 155.35 persons per km2. As of April 1, 2015, the city has an estimated population of 31,274 and 13,128 households. The population density is 145.64 persons per km2, and the total area is 247.62 km2.

Each former town became a ward. The wards here are ordinary wards of a city, unlike the 23 special wards of Tokyo.

Geography
Located in the Yamato Plateau in northeastern Nara Prefecture, it is surrounded by mountains in all directions. The Kintetsu Osaka Line has a major role in transportation in Uda.

Neighboring municipalities
 Nara Prefecture
 Nara
 Soni
 Sakurai
 Yamazoe
 Yoshino
 Higashiyoshino
 Mie Prefecture
 Nabari

Climate
Uda has a humid subtropical climate (Köppen climate classification Cfa), which is hot and humid in the summer (above ) and is somewhat cold in the winter with temperatures dropping to around freezing.

Demographics
Per Japanese census data, the population of Uda in 2020 is 28,121 people. Uda has been conducting censuses since 1950.

Transportation

Rail
 Kintetsu Railway
 Osaka Line: Haibara Station - Murōguchiōno Station - Sambommatsu Station

Road
Japan National Route 165
Japan National Route 166
Japan National Route 369
Japan National Route 370

Visitor attractions
 Murō-ji - A temple with The five-storied pagoda of Murō-ji
 Uda Mikumari Shrine - A shrine, one of the National Treasure of Japan.
 Uda Matsuyama Castle  - A castle ruin, one of the Continued Top 100 Japanese Castles .

References

External links

 Uda City official website 

 
Populated places established in 2006
Cities in Nara Prefecture